ARC Gloria is a three-masted barque.  She is a training ship and official flagship of the Colombian Navy.

The Colombian Government authorized its navy to acquire a training ship in 1966. A contract was signed with the Spanish shipyard Celaya of Bilbao in October 1966, and began to be fulfilled in April 1967. The ship was commissioned on 7 September 1968 with the vessel moored at the wharf of Deusto Channel. She is one of four similar barques built as sail training vessels for Latin American navies; her half-sisters are the Mexican , the Venezuelan  and the Ecuadoran . Their design is similar to the 1930 designs of the German firm Blohm & Voss, like ,  and NRP Sagres.

The ship's name is a reference to the national anthem, Oh gloria inmarcesible (O Unfading Glory).

Currently (2019), captain of the ship is Camilo M. Gutiérrez Olano.

References 

 Armada Nacional República de Colombia
 

Training ships of the Colombian Navy
Ships built in Spain
1968 ships
Sail training ships